Early parliamentary elections were held in Moldova on 29 July 2009. The Party of Communists of the Republic of Moldova (PCRM) won 48 of the 101 seats, but lost the majority they had won in the April elections.

Background
The country's parliament, elected months earlier, was dissolved by president Vladimir Voronin on 15 June 2009, after it had twice failed to elect a new president.

Before the dissolution of the parliament, the electoral threshold was lowered from 6% to 5% and the minimum participation rate was lowered from half the electorate to a third of the electorate. A poll from mid-July gave the PCRM only 29.7%, with the combined opposition (including the Democratic Party of Moldova now led by PCRM defector Marian Lupu) at over 40%. PCRM leader Voronin did not rule out entering into a "grand coalition" with the opposition parties if the election results were inconclusive.

Conduct
Five Ukrainian election observers within the European Network of Election Monitoring Organizations (ENEMO) were deported from Moldova the day before the elections. According to the expelled observers, the Central Election Commission of Moldova registered only 55 of the 140 observers from ENEMO.

Results
Voronin's party, the PCRM, received around 45% of the vote, whilst the other four parties that won seats each received between 7% and 16%. However, the combined opposition parties secured more seats, and went in discussion over forming a coalition. This has led some commentators to declare the election a loss for the Communists.

By district

Reactions
The Organization for Security and Cooperation in Europe, which was observing the election, said that whilst evidence had been found of "subtle intimidation and media bias", it concluded that major electoral fraud did not occur.

After the results had been announced, Voronin acknowledged that there had been a swing in the popular vote against his party, and said he wants a "principled dialogue with all the political forces."  Neither the Communists nor the opposition parties combined had the three-fifths of parliament, 61 seats, necessary to elect a new president without gaining the support of some members of the other side.

Michael Schwirtz of the New York Times said the reason the Communists did not gain a majority of the vote was unknown, though said it could have been the defection of Marian Lupu, a former parliamentary speaker, from the Communists to the Democratic Party of Moldova, which won 13 seats in this election. Lupu was suggested as the next president.

Aftermath
On 8 August 2009 four parties – Liberal Democratic Party (PLDM), the Liberal Party (PL), the Democratic Party (PDM), and the Our Moldova Alliance (AMN) – agreed to create a governing coalition named the Alliance for European Integration (AIE), their combined 53 seats being enough to push the Communist party (PCRM) into opposition.

Elected MPs

The list of deputies elected in the 29 July 2009 parliamentary elections:

Party of Communists (PCRM)

On December 15, 2009, PCRM MPs Vladimir Țurcan, Victor Stepaniuc, Ludmila Belcencova, and Valentin Guznac left the Party of Communists' parliamentary faction, on grounds that the concerned group of lawmakers did not agree with the latest decisions by the PCRM's leadership. On March 17, 2010, Svetlana Popa left the Party of Communists' parliamentary faction.

Liberal Democratic Party (PLDM)

Liberal Party (PL)

Democratic Party (PDM)

Our Moldova Alliance (AMN)

References

External links
July 2009 parliamentary elections eDemocracy
 Central Electoral Commission

2009 elections in Moldova
2009 in Moldova
Moldova
Parliamentary elections in Moldova
July 2009 events in Europe